Plaza Elíptica is a station on Line 6 and Line 11 of the Madrid Metro. It is located in fare Zone A.

References 

Line 6 (Madrid Metro) stations
Line 11 (Madrid Metro) stations
Railway stations in Spain opened in 1981